Westbrook is a ward and suburb in north west Warrington, in the Warrington district, in the ceremonial county of Cheshire, England. Within the boundaries of the historic county of Lancashire, it forms part of the civil parish of Burtonwood and Westbrook, to part of which it gives its name. The main part of Westbrook was built in the early 1980s. There are new estates being developed, the newest (Chapelford) was started in 2001.

Facilities 
The original estate (area around Westbrook Crescent and Cromwell Avenue) has an out of town shopping area. The shopping centre is known as the "Westbrook Centre", and has a large Asda supermarket as well as many smaller specialist stores. Westbrook also has a cinema adjacent to the shopping centre.

There are two primary schools in Westbrook, St Phillips C of E Primary School and Old Hall Primary School, the nearest high schools are St. Gregory's Catholic High School and Great Sankey High School.

There are various pubs in the district. There are also playing fields and parkland. Sankey Valley Park is also a short distance away.

Travel 
The centre of Westbrook is served by many buses. On average the journey to Warrington takes 14 to 22 minutes depending on route. The buses serving Westbrook are the 17 and 18 direct to Warrington town centre (18E in evening), and the 13, 29A, 29C via Chapelford.

Demographics
Note: Statistics expressed as percentages may not add up to 100%

Politics
It is in the Westbrook ward of Warrington borough. There are two councillors, one representing the Labour Party and one the Liberal Democrats.

Census data
Data is based on that of Westbrook Ward.

Population
Total Population: 6,450 residents
Male:Female ratio: 49.7%:50.3%
Average age of population: 34.7 years

Ethnicity breakdown
95.3% White 
0.6% Mixed
0.1% Black
2.6% Asian
1.4% Other

Housing and social situation

Housing situation
Households: 2,294 
92.4% are owner occupied
3.9% are socially rented (i.e. Council Accommodation)
3.7% are privately rented
0.3% are rent free
Average House Price: £111,855

Social situation
Population Density: 14.8 residents per hectare
72.1% of residents say this ward is a "Wealthy" area (based on ACORN index)
Based on the Index of Multiple Deprivation, this is ranked as a "very above average" (in terms of economics) in Warrington, with an index of around 90.0%.
3.9% of residents are on some form of benefits.
2.5% of households are classed as overcrowded.

Employment and education

Employment
63.6% are employed.
1.7% are unemployed.
3.5% are full-time students (therefore classed as active).
21.2% are classed as "economically inactive".

Education
16.7% have no qualifications whatsoever.
52.7% have only level 1 or 2 qualifications.
25.1% have level 3 or higher (i.e. non-compulsory qualifications).

See also
Listed buildings in Burtonwood and Westbrook

References

Populated places in Cheshire
Warrington